Hoodman Blind is a 1923 American silent drama film directed by John Ford. It is a remake of a 1913 film of the same name directed by James Gordon and a 1916 William Farnum Fox feature titled A Man of Sorrow and based on the play Hoodman Blind.

Plot
As described in a film magazine review, John Linden, a victim of wanderlust, jumbles up his life and that of his two daughters. One is a daughter by marriage, the other an offspring of Jessie Walton, a young woman of the village. Noting the resemblance of the two, unscrupulous Mark Lezzard, the sea town's only lawyer, arouses the jealousy of the first daughter's husband Jack Yeulette, the skipper of a fishing smack, hoping to gain her for himself and thereby obtain control over the money John provides for her on a regular basis. After much havoc, happiness is the lot of everyone except Lezzard, whom the crowd "fixes" when they learn of what a wretch he is.

Cast

Preservation
With no prints of Hoodman Blind located in any film archives, it is a lost film.

See also
 List of lost films
 List of Fox Film films

References

External links

1923 films
1923 drama films
1923 lost films
American silent feature films
Remakes of American films
Silent American drama films
American black-and-white films
Films directed by John Ford
Fox Film films
Lost American films
Lost drama films
1920s American films